The 1945 Montana Grizzlies football team represented the University of Montana in the 1945 college football season as a member of the Pacific Coast Conference (PCC). The Grizzlies were led by first-year head coach George Dahlberg, played their home games at Dornblaser Field and finished the season with a record of one win and four losses (1–4, 0–1 PCC).

Schedule

References

Montana
Montana Grizzlies football seasons
Montana Grizzlies football